Francisco Vera Cabeza de Vaca (1637–1700) was a Spanish portrait painter, and pupil of J. Martinez, born at Calatayud. He was a page to Don John of Austria.

References

17th-century Spanish painters
Spanish male painters
1637 births
1700 deaths